Server Monitor is Apple's IPMI-based tool for communicating with a remote baseboard management controller (BMC) that implements their lights-out management (LOM) system. It is available as part of the server admin tools package on a CD with the server software and as a download from their website. It can manage their Xserve line of servers which are currently their only product line that has such an LOM solution.

External links
 Mac OS X server page
 support.apple.com: TCP and UDP ports used by Apple software

MacOS Server